Major-General Sir Harold Daniel Edmund Parsons KCMG, CB (3 July 1863 – 13 February 1925) was a British Army officer.

Military career
Parsons was commissioned into the Queen's Royal Regiment (West Surrey) on 10 May 1882. He saw active service during the Third Anglo-Burmese War and then, as an ordnance officer, during the Second Boer War. He also served in the First World War and then became Principal Ordnance Officer in 1920 before retiring in 1923.

Parsons was appointed Colonel-Commandant of the Royal Army Ordnance Corps on 18 October 1924, four months before his death in February 1925, aged 61.

Namesake
Parsons Barracks at Donnington near Telford, Shropshire was named for him.

References

1863 births
1925 deaths
British Army personnel of World War I
British Army generals
Knights Commander of the Order of St Michael and St George
Companions of the Order of the Bath
Queen's Royal Regiment officers
British military personnel of the Third Anglo-Burmese War
British Army personnel of the Second Boer War
Royal Army Ordnance Corps officers